The women's individual at the 2004 Summer Olympics as part of the archery programme were held at the Panathinaiko Stadium.

The heavily favored Korean women, who had taken the top three spots in the ranking round, won gold and silver medals as well as setting a new world record for a 72-arrow round.  Park Sung-hyun and Lee Sung Jin defeated every opponent they faced until their final match against each other, which Park won for the gold medal.  Alison Williamson of Great Britain, who was ranked only 21st after the ranking round, was able to win a number of upsets to make it to the semi-finals.  After losing that match, she pulled off one more upset to finish with a bronze medal.

Ranking round
The ranking round was held on 12 August at 09:00 at Dekelia Air Force Base. In the 72 arrow ranking round, the Korean women dominated the field, taking the top three spots and setting a world record with Park Sung-hyun's score of 682.  The Chinese women also did well, placing 4th, 5th, and 11th.  Yuan Shu Chi and Wu Hui Ju of Chinese Taipei finished 6th and 10th.

Competition bracket

Section 1

Section 2

Section 3

Section 4

Finals

Event summary
Round of 64
In the first round of elimination on 15 August, archers competed head-to-head.  Each fired six ends of three arrows.  Winners advanced to the round of 32, while losers received a final ranking between 33 and 64 based on their score in the round. Sayami Matsushita had the highest score of the round with 165.

The first big surprise of the round came when Tshering Chhoden of Bhutan, who had been ranked 54th, defeated 11th-ranked Lin Sang of China.  This set Chhoden up for a round of 32 match with 43rd-ranked Reena Kumari of India, who had also won in an upset.  One archer from the top ten, Natalia Valeeva of Italy, lost in the first round, to 56th-ranked Jasmin Figueroa of the Philippines.

Perhaps the most exciting match of the day was between Małgorzata Sobieraj and Thin Thin Khaing, who tied with 151.  Each archer shot a 9 on the first tie-breaking arrow and another 9 on the second.  When the third tie-breaker resulted in an 8 for each archer, it was not possible to separate the two archers, even by measuring the distance to the centre of the target. It was only the second time in Olympic history  that a fourth arrow was required to separate two archers, the first having been in Atlanta. Sobieraj's fourth arrow was better, giving her the win.

Round of 32
Held on 17 August, the second round of elimination, like the first, was a head-to-head competition in which each archer fired six ends of three arrows.  Winners advanced to the round of 16, while losers received a final rank between 17 and 32 based on their scores in the round.  Yun Mi-Jin of Korea scored 173 in the round, tying the Olympic record she set at the 2000 Summer Olympics.

52nd-ranked Kirstin Jean Lewis pulled off her second upset of the tournament, defeating 20th-ranked Sumangala Sharma to become the lowest ranked archer to advance.  Jennifer Nichols, ranked 19th, was the only other archer to win an upset, against 14th-ranked Tetyana Berezhna.  4th-ranked He Ying, however, nearly became the third upset victim and the only top ten archer of the day to fall when Melissa Jennison forced a tie-breaker that He won 9–8.  Tshering Chhoden, who had won a major upset in the first round, nearly pulled off another, forcing Reena Kumari into a tie-breaker, which Kumari won.

Round of 16
The third round of elimination, on 18 August, was the final one that used the 18 arrow match.  Winners advanced to the quarterfinals, while the losers received final rankings between 9 and 16 depending on their score in the round.  Park Sung-hyun had the highest score of the round, as the three Koreans continued to win.

The Chinese women were handed another defeat at the hands of Alison Williamson of Great Britain, who at 21st was the only archer not from the top ten to qualify for the quarterfinals.  The archers from Chinese Taipei both continued into the quarterfinals, as did Evangelia Psarra of Greece.

Quarterfinals
With 8 archers left, the quarterfinal matches on 18 August consisted of each archer firing four ends of three arrows.  Winners advanced to the semifinals while the losers received final rankings between 5 and 8.  The highest score of the round again was notched by Park Sung-hyun, with 111 points.

Alison Williamson continued a great run, defeating 4th-ranked He Ying to advance to the semifinals.  He missed the target with two arrows, but would have needed to score perfect 10s on each of those arrows to even tie Williamson and force a tie-breaker.  Park Sung-hyun easily defeated Evangelia Psarra, scoring no less than 27 in any end of three arrows.  In two matches between Korean archers and archers from Chinese Taipei, Yun Mi-Jin was the only Korean to lose so far in the women's competition, falling to Yuan Shu Chi.  Lee Sung Jin, however, was able to come from behind to defeat Wu Hui Ju to keep Korea in contention for two medals.

Semifinals
With only four archers left, the semifinals featured 12-arrow matches.  The two winners faced each other in the gold medal match, while the losers of the semifinals faced off for the bronze medal.  For the third round in a row, Park Sung-hyun posted the high score, this time with a 110.

Lee Sung Jin and Yuan Shu Chi were the first two archers to compete.  The first end resulted in a tie at 27.  Lee began to pull away in the second end, scoring 26 to Shu's 24.  In each of the third and fourth ends, Lee increased his lead, finishing with a safe 6-point victory to advance to the final. Park and Alison Williamson were next.  Williamson's surprising run for gold came to a crash, as Park continued to be nearly perfect.  Once again, Park did not score lower than 27 in any end of three arrows, dominating each end and advancing to face fellow Korean Lee in the finals.

Bronze medal match
The bronze medal match pitted Yuan Shu Chi, who had started with a 6th place in the ranking round, against Alison Williamson, who had started at 21st.  Each archer fired four ends of three arrows, with the winner receiving a bronze medal while the loser would go home with a 4th-place finish and no medal.

The first end was a good one for both archers, with Yuan scoring a 10 and two 9s while Williamson matched the score with two 10s and an 8.  Yuan kept up the pace with another 28 in the second end, as Williamson faltered slightly and dropped 3 points behind with a 25.  Williamson caught up in the third end, however, with a 27 to Yuan's 25.  Yuan took the lead again with the first arrow of the last end, but again Williamson brought it back to a tie with the second arrow.  With the score tied and one arrow remaining, Williamson shot an 8 to Yuan's 7, claiming the bronze medal.

Final
The women's gold medal match pitted two Koreans against each other.  The two had dominated the competition from the beginning, with Park Sung-hyun placing 1st in the ranking round and Lee Sung Jin placing 2nd.

In the first end, Park shot a rare 26, breaking a long string of ends no lower than 27.  Lee matched the score, then hit a perfect 30 in the second end.  Park returned to form in the second end with a 27, but this still left her 3 points behind.  Park continued to build on her scores with a 28 in the third end, bringing the match to 2 points when Lee shot a 27.  The fourth end was Park's best of the match while it was Lee's worst, as Park reversed the deficit with a 29–25 final end to take the gold, 110–108.  Lee received a silver medal.

References

Women's individual
2004 in women's archery
Women's events at the 2004 Summer Olympics